Northshield Rings is a prehistoric site, a hillfort near the village of Eddleston and about  north of Peebles, in the Scottish Borders, Scotland. It is a Scheduled Monument.

Description
The fort, on a rounded hill a short distance south of Portmore Loch, has well-preserved defences. There are two ramparts outside this. There are three entrances, in the north-west, south and south-east. Within the inner enclosure, seven slight depressions have been found, of diameter , thought to be the sites of timber round-houses.

References

Hill forts in Scotland
Archaeological sites in the Scottish Borders
Scheduled Ancient Monuments in the Scottish Borders